HD 215114 is a double star in the equatorial constellation of Aquarius. As of 2012, the pair have an angular separation of 2.29″ along a position angle of 306.4°.

References

External links
 Image HD 215114

Aquarius (constellation)
215114
Spectroscopic binaries
A-type main-sequence stars
8645
Durchmusterung objects
112168